Saint Sinner (full title Clive Barker Presents Saint Sinner) is a 2002 horror television film written by Doris Egan and Hans Rodionoff based on a short story by executive producer Clive Barker. It was directed by Joshua Butler.  Aside from the title, it is unrelated to the comic-book series published by Marvel Comics' Razorline imprint and created by Barker. In this film, an immortal monk hunts down two succubi. It premiered on the U.S. Sci Fi Channel on October 26, 2002.

Plot
In 1815 California, Father Michael, an emissary of Pope Pius VII, has traveled to meet with novice monk Brother Tomas. The young monk's order serves as the secret repository for evil, supernatural objects collected by the Church, and kept there for safekeeping. Michael delivers an ancient statue that has trapped two beautiful female demons, Munkar and Nakir. Tomas and his friend Brother Gregory inadvertently release the murderous demons, who travel to the 21st century using the monastery's Wheel of Time.

As his brother lies dying, he is given a chance to redeem himself by going through the Wheel of Time with a sacred dagger previously used by Saint Nicodemus to imprison the succubi. Tomas reluctantly intends to track down the evil creatures and destroy them. The young monk takes on the task, traveling through the Wheel only to discover a future world he does not understand in present-day Seattle, Washington, where he allies with police detective Rachel Dressler to recapture the homicidal terrors.

While the creatures seek to satisfy their centuries-long hunger, Tomas discovers their first victim. The police arrive on the murder scene and take Tomas into custody, believing he may be involved. Detective Rachel Dressler (Ravera) isn't about to believe Tomas' weird story, but strange things start to happen and bodies begin to pile up. Both Tomas and Rachel soon discover that the only way to stop these horrifying demons will be to take a leap of faith.

Cast
 Greg Serano as Brother Tomas
 Gina Ravera as Detective Rachel Dressler
 Mary Mara	as Munkar
 Rebecca Harrell as Nakir
 William B. Davis as Father Michael
 Antonio Cupo as Brother Gregory
 Jay Brazeau as Abbot
 Simon Wong as Wade
 Boyan Vukelic as Playland Guard
 Brian Drummond as Officer #1
 Peter Bryant as Officer #2
 Lisa Dahling as Officer #3
 Kris Pope as Brother Rafael
 Robin Mossley as Clark
 Donna Yamamoto as Irate Mother
 Justine Wong as Little Girl
 David Thomson as Vince

In other media
The telefilm's title originated with the Barker-created 1993 comic book Saint Sinner from Marvel Comics' Razorline imprint. In Barker's words: "I was always disappointed with the way that Marvel handled that entire line of comics, particularly Saint Sinner. I thought that's a waste of a good title. It was something that called for finding a new life in some way or another".

References

External links
 

2002 films
2002 television films
2002 horror films
2000s science fiction horror films
American science fiction horror films
Canadian science fiction horror films
Demons in film
English-language Canadian films
Films about Catholic priests
Films about immortality
Films about time travel
Films based on short fiction
Films based on works by Clive Barker
Films directed by Joshua Butler
Films scored by Christopher Lennertz
Films set in 1815
Films set in the 21st century
Films set in California
Films set in Seattle
Films shot in Vancouver
Films with screenplays by Doris Egan
Succubi in film
Syfy original films
2000s American films
2000s Canadian films
2000s English-language films